Mount Olivet Cemetery is a  cemetery located in Nashville, Tennessee. It is located approximately two miles East of downtown Nashville, and adjacent to the Catholic Calvary Cemetery. It is open to the public during daylight hours.

History

Antebellum era
The Mount Olivet Cemetery was established by Adrian Van Sinderen Lindsley and John Buddeke in 1856. It was modelled after the Mount Auburn Cemetery. In the 1870s, a chapel designed in the Gothic Revival architectural style by Hugh Cathcart Thompson was built as an office.

The Southern aristocracy was buried in a separate section from common folks. These included planters as well as former governors of Tennessee, U.S. Senators, and U.S. Congressional Representatives. In the antebellum era, slaves were often buried near their owners.

Visitors to Nashville were buried alongside paupers.

Confederate circle
After the American Civil War, "the Ladies Memorial Society of Nashville with surviving Confederate veterans such as William B. Bate, Daniel Carter, General Benjamin Cheatham, and Thomas Harding purchased 26,588 square feet in the center of Mount Olivet and established Confederate Circle" for the interment of Confederate dead. It was used for the interment of Confederate soldiers who had died on nearby battlegrounds and as a memorial to their sacrifice. Women organized such memorial associations and raised money for interment of Confederate soldiers in major cities across the South and areas where there were concentrations of bodies. The memorial association arranged for burials of about 1,500 soldiers at Confederate Circle. They also built an obelisk.

World War I and beyond
A plaque in memory of Nashvillians who died in World War I was dedicated by General Hugh Mott in 1924.

The cemetery was purchased by Stewart Enterprises in 1994.

On January 25, 2015, the chapel, by then listed on the National Register of Historic Places, burned.

Notable burials

 Adelicia Acklen, plantation and slave owner.
 Emma Louise Ashford, American organist, composer, and music editor
 Oswald Avery, acclaimed scientist whose experiments proved that DNA is the substance that carried genes.
 John Meredith Bass, Mayor of Nashville from 1833–34, and in 1869.
 William B. Bate, Governor of Tennessee (1883–87), American Civil War general.
 Fannie Battle, Confederate spy and social reformer
 John Bell, United States Senator and presidential candidate
 Aaron V. Brown, Governor of Tennessee (1845–47), United States Postmaster General from 1857–59
 James Stephens Brown, Mayor of Nashville from 1908–09
 Lytle Brown, major general in the U.S. Army
 George P. Buell, Union Army general
 Joseph Wellington Byrns, United States Congressman and Speaker of the House
 John Catron, U.S. Supreme Court Justice.
 Benjamin F. ("Frank") Cheatham, Confederate general during the American Civil War.
 Mark R. Cockrill (1788–1872), cattleman, planter, and "Wool King of the World".
 Clarence Kelley Colley (1869–1956), architect.
 Washington Bogart Cooper (1802–1888), painter.
 Elizabeth Litchfield Cunnyngham (1831–1911), missionary and church worker
 George A. Dickel (1818–1894), liquor dealer and wholesaler
 Anne Dallas Dudley (1876–1955), women's suffrage activist.
 Guilford Dudley, U.S. ambassador to Denmark under the Nixon and Ford presidential administrations.
 George Dury (18171894), portrait painter
 Edward H. East (1830–1904), Tennessee Secretary of State, briefly served as the state's "acting governor" in 1865
 Joseph Thorpe Elliston (1779–1856), silversmith, owner of the Burlington plantation, fourth mayor of Nashville, 1814–17
 Sarah Polk Fall (1847–1924) Nashville socialite and unofficially adopted daughter of former first Lady Sarah Polk
 Jesse Babcock Ferguson, onetime minister of the Nashville Church of Christ, later associated with Spiritualism and Universalism
 Thomas Frist, co-founder of Hospital Corporation of America and father of the former majority leader of the U.S. Senate, Bill Frist
 Francis Furman (1816–1899), Nashville businessman during the Reconstruction era. His tomb, designed by sculptor Johannes Gelert (1852–1923), is the largest one in Mount Olivet Cemetery.
 Sidney Clarence Garrison (1885–1945), second President of Peabody College (now part of Vanderbilt University), 1938–45
 Meredith Poindexter Gentry, United States Congressman
 Carl Giers, early photographer
 Alvan Cullem Gillem, Civil War Union general and post-bellum Indian fighter
 Caroline Meriwether Goodlett, co-founder of the United Daughters of the Confederacy
 Vern Gosdin 1934–2009 country music legend
 William Crane Gray, (1835–1919), First Episcopal Bishop of the Missionary Jurisdiction of Southern Florida
 Felix Grundy (1775–1840), U.S. Senator from Tennessee and 13th Attorney General of the United States.
 George Blackmore Guild (1834–1917), Mayor of Nashville 1891–95.
 Robert Kennon Hargrove (1829–1905), a bishop of the Methodist Episcopal Church, South
 Henry C. Hibbs (1882–1949), architect.
 E. Bronson Ingram, founder of Ingram Industries Inc., parent company of Ingram Barge Company; Ingram Book Company, the nation's largest book distributor; Ingram Micro; and other major companies
 Howell Edmunds Jackson, United States Senator and Supreme Court Justice
 William Hicks Jackson, Confederate general during the American Civil War
 Thomas A. Kercheval, Tennessee State Senator and Mayor of Nashville
 Eugene C. Lewis, engineer, chairman of the Nashville, Chattanooga and St. Louis, civic leader.
 David Lipscomb, founder of Nashville Bible School (now Lipscomb University).
 William Litterer (1834–1917), Mayor of Nashville, 1890–91.
 George Maney, Confederate Civil War general and U.S. Ambassador to Chile, Bolivia, Paraguay, and Uruguay
 Jack C. Massey, co-founder of Hospital Corporation of America and owner of Kentucky Fried Chicken.
 Hill McAlister, Governor of Tennessee from 1933–37
 Randal William McGavock (1826–1863), Mayor of Nashville, 1858–59 and Confederate Lt. Colonel who was killed in the Battle of Raymond.
 Eliza Jane McKissack (1828–1900), founding head of music in 1890 to the forerunner of the University of North Texas College of Music
 Benton McMillin, Governor of Tennessee (1899–1903)
 Kindred Jenkins Morris (1819–1884), Mayor of Nashville, 1869–71.
 Thomas Owen Morris (1845–1924), Mayor of Nashville, 1906–08.
 John W. Morton, Confederate veteran, founder of the Nashville chapter of the Ku Klux Klan,  Tennessee Secretary of State, 1901–09.
 William Nichol (1800–1878), Mayor of Nashville, 1835–37.
 John Overton, friend of Andrew Jackson and one of the founders of Memphis, Tennessee.
 Andrew Price (politician) (1854–1909), Louisiana Congressman
 Bruce Ryburn Payne (1874–1937), founding president of Peabody College (now part of Vanderbilt University), 1911–37.
 Colonel Buckner H. Payne (1799–1889), clergyman, publisher, merchant and racist pamphleteer.
 Fountain E. Pitts (1808–1874), Methodist minister, Confederate chaplain and colonel, first pastor of the West End United Methodist Church in Nashville.
 James E. Rains, American Civil War general killed in the 1862 Battle of Murfreesboro
 Oliver P. Rood, American Civil War soldier, Medal of Honor recipient
 Fred Rose, music publishing executive
 Thomas "Tom" Ryman (1841–1904) Nashville riverboat captain and founder of the Ryman Auditorium
 William Percy Sharpe (1871–1942), Mayor of Nashville, 1922–24
 John Hugh Smith (1819–1870), Mayor of Nashville three times during the 19th century
 Donald W. Southgate (1887–1953), architect
 Edward Bushrod Stahlman (1843–1930), German-born railroad executive, publisher of the Nashville Banner and builder of The Stahlman.
 Ernest Stoneman, country music performer
 Wilbur Fisk Tillett (1854–1936), Methodist clergyman and educator; dean of Vanderbilt's theology school
 Anthony Wayne Van Leer (1783–1864), ironmaster
 George D. Waller (1883–1969), architect.
 David K. Wilson (1919–2007), businessman and philanthropist; major donor to Vanderbilt University and the Republican Party
 Del Wood (1920–1989), country musician, member of the Grand Ole Opry

See also
 Greenwood Cemetery

References

Further reading

External links

 Civil War Trails
 
 

Cemeteries in Nashville, Tennessee
Cemeteries in Tennessee
Protestant Reformed cemeteries
Confederate States of America cemeteries
Cemeteries on the National Register of Historic Places in Tennessee
National Register of Historic Places in Nashville, Tennessee
 
1856 establishments in Tennessee